Cracker, sometimes white cracker or cracka, is a racial epithet directed towards white people, used especially with regard to poor rural whites in the Southern United States. Although commonly a pejorative, it is also used in a neutral context, particularly in reference to a native of Florida or Georgia (see Florida cracker and Georgia cracker).

Etymology
The exact history and etymology of the word is debated.

The term is "probably an agent noun" from the word crack.  The word  was later adopted into Gaelic as the word craic meaning a "loud conversation, bragging talk" where this interpretation of the word is still in use in Ireland, Scotland, and Northern England today. 

The historical derivative of the word craic and its meaning can be seen as far back as the Elizabethan era (1558-1603) where the term crack could be used to refer to "entertaining conversation" (one may be said to "crack" a joke or to be "cracking wise")  The word cracker could be used to describe loud braggarts; An example of this can be seen in William Shakespeare's King John (c. 1595) "What cracker is this same that deafs our ears with this abundance of superfluous breath?" 

The word was later documented describing a group of "Celtic immigrants, Scotch-Irish people who came to America running from political circumstances in the old world". This usage is illustrated in a 1766 letter to the Earl of Dartmouth which reads: 

The label followed the Scotch-Irish American immigrants, who were often seen by officials as "unruly and ill-mannered" The use of the word is further demonstrated in official documents, where the Governor of Florida said, 

By the early 1800s, those immigrants "started to refer to themselves that way as a badge of honor" as is the case with other events of linguistical reappropriation.

The compound corn-cracker was used of poor white farmers (by 1808), especially from Georgia, but also extended to residents of northern Florida, from the cracked kernels of corn which formed a staple food of this class of people. This possibility is given in the 1911 edition of Encyclopædia Britannica, but the Oxford English Dictionary says a derivation of the 18th-century simplex cracker from the 19th-century compound corn-cracker is doubtful.

It has been suggested that white slave foremen in the antebellum South were called "crackers" owing to their practice of "cracking the whip" to drive and punish slaves. Whips were also cracked over pack animals, so "cracker" may have referred to whip-cracking more generally. According to An American Glossary (1912):

Another possibility, which may be a modern folk etymology, supposes that the term derives from "soda cracker", a type of light wheat biscuit which dates in the Southern US to at least the Civil War. The idea has possibly been influenced by "whitebread", a similar term for white people.  "Soda cracker" and even "white soda cracker" have become extended versions of "cracker" as an epithet.

Usage

Meliorative and neutral usage

"Cracker" has also been used as a proud or jocular self-description in the past. With the huge influx of new residents from the North, "cracker" is used informally by some white residents of Florida and Georgia ("Florida cracker" or "Georgia cracker") to indicate that their family has lived there for many generations.

Frederick Law Olmsted, a prominent landscape architect from Connecticut, visited the South as a journalist in the 1850s and wrote that "some crackers owned a good many Negroes, and were by no means so poor as their appearance indicated."

In On the Origin of Species, Charles Darwin quotes a Professor Wyman as saying, "one of the 'crackers' (i.e. Virginia squatters) added, 'we select the black members of a litter [of pigs] for raising, as they alone have a good chance of living."

Late 19th century cattle drivers of the southeastern scrub land cracked whips to move cattle. Many slaves and free blacks joined the Seminoles and found work in the cattle business.  Descendants of crackers are often proud of their heritage.

In 1947, the student body of Florida State University voted on the name of their athletic symbol. From a list of more than 100 choices, Seminoles was selected. The other finalists, in order of finish, were Statesmen, Rebels, Tarpons, Fighting Warriors, and Crackers.

Before the Milwaukee Braves baseball team moved to Atlanta, the Atlanta minor league baseball team was known as the "Atlanta Crackers". The team existed under this name from 1901 until 1965. They were members of the Southern Association from their inception until 1961, and members of the International League from 1961 until they were moved to Richmond, Virginia in 1965.

Singer-songwriter Randy Newman, on his socio-politically themed album Good Old Boys (1974) uses the term "cracker" on the song "Kingfish" ("I'm a cracker, You one too, Gonna take good care of you"). The song's subject is Huey Long, populist Governor and then Senator for Louisiana (1928–1935). The term is also used in "Louisiana 1927" from the same album, where the line "Ain't it a shame what the river has done to this poor cracker's land" is attributed to President Coolidge.

In 2008, former President Bill Clinton used the term "cracker" on Larry King Live to describe white voters he was attempting to win over for Barack Obama: "You know, they think that because of who I am and where my politic[al] base has traditionally been, they may want me to go sort of hustle up what Lawton Chiles used to call the 'cracker vote' there."

The Florida Cracker Trail is a route which cuts across central Florida, following the historic trail of the old cattle drives.

On June 27, 2013, in the trial of George Zimmerman concerning the killing of Trayvon Martin, a witness under examination (Rachel Jeantel) testified that Martin, an African-American, had told her over the telephone that a "creepy ass cracker is following me" minutes before the altercation between the two occurred. Zimmerman's attorney then asked her if "creepy ass cracker" was an offensive term, to which she responded "no". The testimony and response brought about both media and public debate about the use of the word "cracker". A CNN report referred to the regional nature of the term, noting both that "some in Florida use the term in a non-derogatory, colloquial sense" and that it is sometimes regarded as a "sharp racial insult that resonates with white southerners even if white northerners don't get it".

Pejorative usage
A 1783 pejorative use of crackers specified men who "descended from convicts that were transported from Great Britain to Virginia at different times, and inherit so much profligacy from their ancestors, that they are the most abandoned set of men on earth".

Benjamin Franklin, in his memoirs (1790), referred to "a race of runnagates and crackers, equally wild and savage as the Indians" who inhabit the "desert[ed] woods and mountains".

In his 1964 speech "The Ballot or the Bullet", Malcolm X used the term "cracker" in reference to white people in a pejorative context. In one passage, he remarked, "It's time for you and me to stop sitting in this country, letting some cracker senators, Northern crackers and Southern crackers, sit there in Washington, D.C., and come to a conclusion in their mind that you and I are supposed to have civil rights. There's no white man going to tell me anything about my rights."

On November 29, 1993, in a speech given at Kean College in New Jersey, Nation of Islam spokesman Khalid Abdul Muhammad called Pope John Paul II "a no good cracker".

In 2012, in Jacksonville, Florida, Michael Dunn murdered Jordan Davis in an argument over loud music coming from a car. Dunn alleged that he had heard the word "cracker" coming from the vehicle occupied by high school aged teenagers. This claim, along with other details in Dunn's testimony, was not substantiated by other witnesses in the criminal proceedings.

See also
 Buckra
White trash
Hillbilly
Honky
List of ethnic slurs and epithets by ethnicity
Jimmy Crack Corn
Peckerwood
Poor White
Redneck
Social class in the United States

References
Specific

General
Brown, Roger Lyle. Ghost Dancing on the Cracker Circuit: The Culture Festivals in the American South (1997)
Burke, Karanja. "Cracker"
 
Cassidy, Frederic G. Dictionary of American Regional English. Harvard University Press, Vol. I, 1985: 825–26
De Graffenried, Clare. "The Georgia Cracker in the Cotton Mills." Century 41 (February 1891): 483–98.
 Keen, George Gillett and Williams, Sarah Pamela. Cracker Times and Pioneer Lives: The Florida Reminiscences of George Gillett Keen and Sarah Pamela Williams edited by James M Denham and Canter Brown Jr. U of South Carolina Press 2000
 Major, Clarence (1994). Juba to Jive: A Dictionary of African-American Slang. Puffin Books.
 McWhiney, Grady. Confederate Crackers and Cavaliers. (Abilene, Tex.: McWhiney Foundation Press, c. 2002. Pp. 312. , collected essays)
 McWhiney, Grady. Cracker Culture: Celtic Ways in the Old South (Tuscaloosa: University of Alabama Press, 1988).
 Otoo, John Solomon. "Cracker: The History of a Southeastern Ethnic, Economic, and Racial Epithet", Names''' 35 (1987): 28–39.
 Osley, Frank L. Plain Folk of the Old South (1949)
 Presley, Delma E. "The Crackers of Georgia", Georgia Historical Quarterly 60 (summer 1976): 102–16.

External links

Cracker – Entry in the New Georgia Encyclopedia''

Pejorative terms for white people
Culture of the Southern United States
English profanity
Stereotypes of rural people
Stereotypes of white Americans
English words